A Sheikh or shaykh (Arabic: شيخ shaykh; pl. شيوخ shuyūkh), of Sufism is a Sufi who is authorized to teach, initiate and guide aspiring dervishes in the Islamic faith. He has laid all his worldly desires to rest thru the one intense desire for knowing the love of God his beloved. The sheik is vital to the path of the novice Sufi, for the sheik has himself travelled the path of mysticism. Viewed as the spiritual master, the sheik forms a formal allegiance (bay'a) to the disciple of Sufism and authorizes the disciple's travels and helps the disciple along the mystical path. Islamic tradition focuses on the importance of chains and legitimization. In Sufism, sheiks are connected by a continuous spiritual chain (isnad, sanad, silsila). This chain links every previous Sufi sheik, and eventually can be traced back to the Successors, and in later times to the Prophet himself. As Sufism grew, influential shayks began to acquire spiritual centers and waypoints known as khanqah, ribat, and zaouia. Sheikhs duplicate the Prophetic realities, and are also expected to perform and act as an intermediary between the Creator and the created, since the sheikh has arrived close to God through his meditations and spiritual travels. There are several types of such sheikh.

A sheik of Barakah (blessing)
This can, for example, be someone who inherits leadership of a group of Sufis, who although he does not have the spiritual standing of a genuine sheik of Tarbiyah (Instruction) nevertheless has a blessing in that by holding to him his followers have unity and community, as is in the Noble Hadith, "The hand of Allah is with the Arabic جماعة  (jama'ah)."

A sheik of Ahwal (states)
This is a sheik who has genuine tasting of the states of Sufism and can transmit them.

A sheik of Tarbiyah (instruction)
This is properly the correct usage of the term sheik according to the Sufis. This is the realised gnostic ('arif) of Allah, who has been granted idhn (permission and authorisation) by God (Allah), to lead the followers of the path of Sufism to knowledge of Allah. This idhn is not to be confused with ijazah (authorisation) granted by a sheik or a scholar to a student to teach. Even if all of the scholars and sheiks granted their ijazah to a student, he would still not be a sheik of Instruction until he had the idhn of Allah and Muhammad. This is manifest in his tawfiq or 'success' in inculcating the perfections of Islam, iman and ihsan in his disciples [point 8, below].

The Teaching-sheik
The sheik of Sufism derives authority and social standing from his sacred knowledge. Students would be taught this knowledge in inner religious circles located in private homes and in mosques, hoping to create an atmosphere of refined religious thought that would safeguard the transmission of religious knowledge. By studying the Hadith and Sunnah in these circles, the students would learn proper decorum and etiquette. From this the Sufi sheiks would establish a set or rituals and practices that would perpetuate the culture of Sufi learning, based upon the Sunnah. Having personal contact with a sheik allows both Sufis and the ulama to stimulate a culture of religious learning. The legitimacy of the sheik is based on the unbroken chain of authors or other sheiks. The shorter the chain the more authoritative the person becomes. Teaching-sheiks provided their disciples with religious instruction as well as theology. During this time student travelled and interacted with different teacher-sheiks. Sufi sheiks flourished throughout the Islamic world more than any other type of personal authority because their mediatory skills were required for the smooth functioning of an agrarian-nomadic economy with a decentralized form of government.

The Directing-sheik
With the advent of institutionalized Sufism in the ninth century came the changed relationship between disciple and sheik. This came at a time in the Islamic world when other institutions were spreading to an ever far-reaching Islamic world, and were facing a collapsing caliphal empire. The sheik became a more authoritative figure, and become synonymous with prophetic traits as well as a totally functional leader. The sheik took on a new role as a permanent and known teacher, not a teaching-guide to a group of disciples. The sheik had permanent residence in a lodge and surrounded himself with his students. The disciples would live with the sheik and would follow the sheiks rules and prescribed behaviors. The lodge became an integral part of the Muslim community, as it maintained land holdings and also supported economic activities in cities. The directing-sheik became an authority for those seeking training and a strengthening of their moral and intellectual character. The shift from teaching-sheik to directing-sheik brought about an unprecedented focus on decorum (adab). Directing-sheiks core characteristic was set within the Sufi context of training others to approach God more closely and intimately. Overall the experience of learning the mystical path of Sufism underneath the guise of the directing-sheik was much more intense than that of the teacher-sheik.

Khirka
The importance of lineage in Sufism is exhibited by one such example as the Khirka. Khirka literally meaning, "Rough cloak, scapular, coarse gown". The cloak acts as an initiation process in Sufism in which the sheik puts his khirka on the disciple, or known as "Investiture with the Cloak". This acts as the manifestation of blessings being transmitted from sheik to disciple. The act is reminiscent of when the Prophet Muhammad placed a cloak over Ali. This process solidifies the sheik-disciple relationship and creates an allegiance. After this process the disciple is able to join the Sufi order and continue studying underneath the sheik.

Silsila
Silsila is used in Sufism to describe the continuous spiritual chain that links Sufi orders and sheiks in a lineage relating back to the Prophet Muhammad and his Companions.

Necessary qualifications of a sheik
The basic requirements for a person to be a Sufi sheik are as follows.

 Being a Muslim with valid tenets of faith ('aqida)
 Having a verifiably public authorization from a spiritual guide to be a spiritual guide, connecting him through a chain of transmission (silsila) without a single break back to the Messenger of Allah (Allah bless him and give him peace).
 Being suitable to take as an exemplar in the religion, not disobedient or wicked in his personal life.
 Knowing the fundamental terms of Sufism such as fanaa' (annihilation), baqaa' (subsistence), marifa (gnosis), and the rest, by having actually tread the path under a sheik and understood them at first hand.
 Exalting the commands of Allah in word and deed, and knowing that it is above every human being.
 Having permission from Allah and Muhammad - beyond the authorization given to him by his sheik - manifest in his tawfiq or 'success' in inculcating the perfections of Islam, iman and ihsan in his disciples.
 Finding a disciple capable of taking his teaching and absorbing his secret from him; that is, being the sheik that Allah has destined for that disciple.
 Not being self-satisfied, or veiled from his own neediness to Allah by his disciples' need for him.

The customary position with the people of Sufism, particularly in the Shadhili and the Darqawi tariqah, is that a person will not be a sheik without having had a background in the basic disciplines of the Qur'an and Sunna. This is the position of Imam Junayd. However, in unusual circumstances there have been exceptions to this rule, among them the famous wali, Abd al-Aziz ad-Dabbagh  of Fez, and in the Darqawi tariqah, the sheik Sidi al-'Arabi ibn al-Huwari from whom sheik Muhammad ibn al-Habib took the tariqah, and most famously sheik Ahmad al-Alawi, a master of Sufism whom all accept without reservation.

The Conditions of a Disciple (related)
 Having a valid aim in taking the path, meaning Allah alone and nothing besides.
 Being genuine, meaning convinced of the secret between one's sheik and Allah, and willing to submit, and listen, and follow.
 Having good manners, noble character, and respect for others.
 Having praiseworthy states such as patience, silence, reliance on Allah, nonattachment to material things, and lack of curiosity about what does not concern one.
 Giving selfless service, whether convenient or inconvenient, to Allah, the sunnah, the tariqa, and to one's fellow man.
 Venerating Allah and Muhammad, the religion, its friends (awliya'), and everything else it is said to have exalted.
 Having high spiritual resolve.
 Unfalteringly carrying out one's decisions, undeterred by the Devil, this world, one's ego, or vain caprice.

See also 
 Pir (Sufism)
 Sheikh (disambiguation)
 Sufism

References

Footnotes

External links

Religious leadership roles
Sufism
Islamic practices
Islamic honorifics